Super Bowl XIX was an American football game between the American Football Conference (AFC) champion Miami Dolphins and the National Football Conference (NFC) champion San Francisco 49ers to decide the National Football League (NFL) champion for the 1984 season. The 49ers defeated the Dolphins by the score of 38–16, to win their second Super Bowl. The game was played on January 20, 1985, at Stanford Stadium, on the campus of Stanford University in Stanford, California, the first Super Bowl played in the San Francisco Bay Area. This also became the second Super Bowl after Super Bowl XIV where the game was coincidentally played in the home market of one of the participants.

The game was hyped as the battle between two great quarterbacks: Miami's Dan Marino and San Francisco's Joe Montana. The Dolphins entered their fifth Super Bowl in team history after posting a 14–2 regular season record. The 49ers were making their second Super Bowl appearance after becoming the first team to win 15 regular season games since the league expanded to a 16-game schedule in 1978.

With Marino and Montana, the game became the first Super Bowl in which the starting quarterbacks of each team both threw for over 300 yards. In addition, the two teams combined for 851 total offensive yards, which at that time was a Super Bowl record. But after trailing 10–7 in the first quarter, the 49ers would end up taking the game in dominating fashion, scoring three touchdowns in the second quarter, and 10 unanswered points in the second half. Montana, who was named the Super Bowl MVP, completed 24 of 35 passes for a Super Bowl-record 331 yards (breaking the mark of 318 yards set by Terry Bradshaw) and three touchdowns. He also broke the Super Bowl record for most rushing yards gained by a quarterback with his 5 rushes for 59 yards and 1 rushing touchdown. San Francisco set a Super Bowl record with 537 total yards breaking the previous record of 429 yards set by the Oakland Raiders in Super Bowl XI.

This was the first Super Bowl to be televised in the United States by ABC, joining the annual broadcasting rotation of the game with CBS and NBC. It was also the first time that the sitting U.S. president participated in the coin toss ceremony; Ronald Reagan appeared live via satellite from the White House and tossed the coin. This Super Bowl was unique in that it fell on the same day that he was inaugurated for a second term; because Inauguration Day (January 20) fell on a Sunday, Reagan was sworn in privately and the public ceremony took place the following day.

Background
NFL owners voted to award Super Bowl XIX to Stanford Stadium on the campus of Stanford University in Stanford, California on December 14, 1982, at the owners' mid-season meeting held in Dallas. Near Palo Alto, it was the first Super Bowl to be held in the San Francisco Bay Area. It became the fourth primarily collegiate stadium to host a Super Bowl, following Tulane Stadium, then the home of the Saints (IV, VI, and IX), Rice Stadium (VIII) and the Rose Bowl (XI, XIV, XVII, XXI, and XXVII). Owners had tentatively planned to award XIX during the owners' meetings in Detroit on June 3, 1981. Tampa (Tampa Stadium), Miami (Orange Bowl), New Orleans (Superdome), Pasadena (Rose Bowl), Detroit (Silverdome), and Dallas (Cotton Bowl) each made presentations that day, with Detroit and Dallas expressedly bidding on only XIX. Tampa was selected for XVIII, but with no outstanding options, owners decided to postpone the awarding of XIX until their 1982 meeting. 

The league eventually reopened the bidding process from scratch. Hosts for both XIX and XX would be selected, and potentially XXI as well. A total of ten cities put in bids: Palo Alto (Stanford Stadium), New Orleans (Superdome), Miami (Orange Bowl), Houston (Rice Stadium), Seattle (Kingdome), Detroit (Silverdome), Pasadena (Rose Bowl), Tampa (Tampa Stadium), Anaheim (Anaheim Stadium), and Jacksonville (Gator Bowl). Stanford Stadium was picked, despite having no lights at the time, no dressing rooms, and a substandard press box. Stadium officials promised much needed renovations, and the league agreed to provide temporary lighting. Representatives from New Orleans stressed that if they were not selected for XX, due to scheduling conflicts, they would not be able to host again until 1990. As such, the Superdome was subsequently selected for XX. Rice Stadium was speculated for XXI, but ultimately no decision was made for that game. Yet again, Miami was rejected, due to the aging condition of the Orange Bowl. A proposed sales tax levy to pay for a new stadium had failed at the ballot box on November 2, further sinking any chances for South Florida.

Miami Dolphins

As the Dolphins advanced to the Super Bowl for the fifth time in franchise history, much of the media focus was on Miami's young quarterback, Dan Marino. In just his second year in the league, he broke nearly every NFL single-season passing record. Marino set a record for the most completions in a season (362) and became the first quarterback to throw for over 5,000 yards, reaching a total of 5,084. He set the record for the most games throwing for at least 300 passing yards (9) and the most games with 400 yards (4). Marino's 48 touchdown passes broke the previous record of 36, which was held by both George Blanda for the Houston Oilers in 1961 and Y. A. Tittle for the New York Giants in 1963. And he had the most games (6) and the most consecutive games (4) with at least 4 touchdown passes.

Thus going into Super Bowl XIX, many sports writers predicted that it would be the first of many Super Bowls that Marino would play in during his career. Marino had a unique ability to read the defenses quickly before setting up to throw, and his skill of quickly releasing the ball made it very difficult for defenders to sack him. In addition, he had protection given to him by an offensive line led by their All-Pro, and future Hall of Fame center Dwight Stephenson and Pro Bowl guard Ed Newman.  Coming into Super Bowl XIX, Marino had only been sacked 13 times in the regular season and not once in the playoffs.

The Dolphins had a number of offensive threats for Marino to use. Wide receivers Mark Clayton (73 receptions, 1,389 yards, 18 touchdowns) and Mark Duper (71 receptions, 1,306 yards, 8 touchdowns) became the first teammates to each gain over 1,300 receiving yards in one season, while Clayton's 18 touchdown catches broke the NFL single-season record of 17 set by Don Hutson in 1942. Receiver Nat Moore caught 43 passes for 574 yards and 6 touchdowns, while tight end Dan Johnson contributed 34 receptions for 426 yards. While Miami's main offensive attack was passing, they still had a trio of great running backs: Tony Nathan, Woody Bennett, and Joe Carter. Both Nathan and Bennett finished the season with over 1,000 combined rushing and receiving yards, while Carter contributed 495 rushing yards.  Despite Miami's superb offense, punter Reggie Roby still made the Pro Bowl, averaging 44.7 yards per punt with a net gain average of 38.7.

However, the Dolphins' defense was a little suspect. They tied the Houston Oilers and the Minnesota Vikings for the most rushing yards allowed during the regular season (4.7 yards per attempt), and ranked just 19th in fewest yards allowed (5,759). The main bright spots on the defense were safeties, brothers Lyle and Glenn Blackwood, along with Pro Bowl inside linebacker A. J. Duhe, Pro Bowl nose tackle Bob Baumhower, and defensive end Doug Betters. Glenn Blackwood had picked off 6 passes during the season and returned them for 169 yards, while Betters recorded 14 sacks and a fumble recovery. Linebacker Charles Bowser was also a big contributor, recording 9 sacks and one fumble recovery.

Despite their defensive flaws, the Dolphins' powerful offense led the NFL in scoring (513 points) and total yards gained (7,064), and helped the team reach an AFC best 14–2 regular season record.

San Francisco 49ers

The 49ers advanced to their second Super Bowl in team history after becoming the first team to win 15 regular season games since the league expanded to a 16-game schedule in 1978. Much of the hype surrounding the team was their offense, which boasted five Pro Bowlers. Quarterback Joe Montana recorded 279 completions out of 432 attempts for 3,630 yards, 28 touchdowns, and only 10 interceptions. Fullback Roger Craig was one of the 49ers' major weapons, both rushing and receiving. Craig was the team's second-leading rusher with 649 rushing yards and 7 touchdowns, and also caught 71 passes for 675 yards. Pro Bowl halfback Wendell Tyler, who had rushed for a team record 1,262 yards during the regular season, recorded 7 rushing touchdowns, and also caught 28 passes for 230 yards and 2 touchdown receptions. Tight End (and former fullback) Earl Cooper also made an impact with 41 receptions for 459 yards and 4 touchdowns. Wide receivers Freddie Solomon and Dwight Clark also were deep threats, gaining a combined total of 1,617 yards and 16 touchdowns. Up front, three of the 49ers' five starting offensive linemen, Randy Cross, Fred Quillan, and Keith Fahnhorst, had been selected to play in the Pro Bowl. Overall, San Francisco's offense finished the season ranked second in the NFL in scoring (475 points) and fourth in total yards (6,544).

Although they did not get as much media attention as the offense, the 49ers' defense led the league in fewest points allowed during the regular season (227). All four of the 49ers' starting defensive backs, Ronnie Lott, Eric Wright, Carlton Williamson, and Dwight Hicks, were selected to play in the Pro Bowl. Pro Bowl linebacker Keena Turner was also a major defensive weapon, recording 2 sacks and 4 interceptions for 51 yards. Defensive end Dwaine Board anchored the line, recording 10 sacks and a fumble recovery.  Future hall of fame Defensive end Fred Dean missed the first 11 games of the season holding out over a contract dispute, but immediately made his presence felt upon returning, recording 4 sacks in his five games.

Playoffs

The Dolphins gained 405 yards of total offense in their 31–10 playoff win over the Seattle Seahawks, and over 500 yards as they defeated the Pittsburgh Steelers, 45–28, in the AFC Championship Game. In the victory over the Steelers (the only team to beat San Francisco during the season), Marino completed 21 of 32 passes for 421 yards and 4 touchdowns, with 1 interception.

Meanwhile, the 49ers' underrated defense allowed the team to blitz through the playoffs. Although Montana threw a combined total of 5 interceptions in their 2 games, they only gave up a combined total of 10 points and no touchdowns in their victories over the New York Giants, 21–10, and the Chicago Bears, 23–0.

At 33–3, the combined records for the two teams coming into the game were and still are the best in Super Bowl history. The 49ers were 17–1 and the Dolphins 16–2 including their playoff games.

Pregame news and notes
The 49ers' practice facility was located in Redwood City at the time, just  from Stanford Stadium. Promotion for the Super Bowl also contributed to that feeling with many photographs of the Vince Lombardi Trophy near San Francisco landmarks such as the Golden Gate Bridge. Thus, the 49ers were considered the only team to have won the Super Bowl at home until the Tampa Bay Buccaneers achieved the same feat in Super Bowl LV in 2021. The Los Angeles Rams also played near home at the Rose Bowl in Pasadena, California in Super Bowl XIV, but lost to the Pittsburgh Steelers. In February 2022 the Rams beat the Cincinnati Bengals in Super Bowl LVI at SoFi Stadium in Inglewood, their home since 2020.

The 49ers, as the designated home team in the annual rotation between AFC and NFC teams, wore their home red uniforms and gold pants. The Dolphins wore their all-white road uniforms.

Broadcasting

Television
As a result of the 1982 television contract signed by the NFL with the three networks, this game was the first Super Bowl to be televised in the United States by ABC, as they earned their first turn at the Super Bowl, with a new alternation process started for the 1983 game. Previously, the Super Bowl telecast alternated between CBS and NBC, while the networks simulcast the first AFL-NFL World Championship Game.

ABC's NFL program, Monday Night Football, happened to be celebrating its 15th season in 1984. Two more ABC-aired Super Bowls would occur during major anniversary seasons for MNF – Super Bowl XXIX (also won by the 49ers) closed out the 25th anniversary season (1994), and Super Bowl XXXIV (won by the St. Louis Rams, division rivals of the 49ers) closed out the 30th anniversary season (1999).

This Super Bowl also marked the first to have closed captioning in real time throughout the game courtesy of the National Captioning Institute (previous Super Bowls only had "scoreboard information" captioned); with the captioning sponsored by Ford Motor Company and Kentucky Fried Chicken.

Announcers
Frank Gifford was the play-by-play announcer, while then-ABC Sports analyst Don Meredith and then-Washington Redskins quarterback Joe Theismann served as color commentators. Al Michaels and Jim Lampley hosted the pregame (2 hours), halftime, and postgame (Lampley presided over the Vince Lombardi Trophy presentation ceremony) coverage for ABC. Michaels and Lampley were joined by analysts O. J. Simpson (who would normally have been the second color commentator; when interviewed as to why Theismann would join Gifford and Meredith in the booth instead of Simpson; director Chet Forte was quoted in the January 14, 1985 edition of Broadcasting Magazine as saying that Theismann could contribute more due to having played both teams in the regular-season as well as having played in the two previous Super Bowls.) and Tom Landry (in a separate booth during the game). Also helping out with ABC's coverage were Jack Whitaker, Dick Schaap, Donna de Varona, Ray Gandolf, and ABC News reporters Stone Phillips, Jeff Greenfield, Judd Rose, and Bill Redeker.

This would be the only ABC Super Bowl for Gifford as play-by-play announcer, the final game for Don Meredith and the second (and last) time a commentator for the Super Bowl (Theismann) was an active player (Jack Kemp in Super Bowl II was the only other active player to provide commentary). Michaels would call ABC's next six Super Bowls, until the network lost their NFL rights in 2006.

Aftergame
ABC featured MacGruder and Loud after the game.

Radio
Jack Buck was the play-by-play announcer, while Hank Stram served as color commentator for CBS Radio Sports' national coverage. Brent Musburger hosted the pregame, halftime, and postgame coverage for CBS Radio; Musburger was joined by analysts Irv Cross and Jimmy "The Greek" Snyder. Locally, Super Bowl XIX was broadcast by WIOD in Miami with Rick Weaver and Hank Goldberg; and by KCBS in San Francisco with Don Klein and Don Heinrich.

Overseas broadcasts
Shown on Channel 4, the XIX Super Bowl was the third to be broadcast live and in its entirety in the United Kingdom.

Super Bowl XIX was simulcast in Canada on CTV.

In Australia, Super Bowl XIX was broadcast on the Nine Network, live from 10.00am (Australian Eastern Summer Time) on Monday, January 21, 1985, with a repeat screening late at night. This was the first Super Bowl to be telecast in Australia.

In popular culture
Clips from this game can be seen in the movie Ace Ventura: Pet Detective as the character Ray Finkle is in reality Dolphins kicker Uwe von Schamann. Von Schamann made three field goals and an extra point in this game, but Finkle missed the game-winning field goal in a fictional Super Bowl XIX. The latter play actually occurred six years later in Super Bowl XXV.

The NFL's Greatest Games episode Masters of the Game focuses on Super Bowl XIX. The film was narrated by Brad Crandall after legendary NFL Films announcer John Facenda died in September 1984. This was the last Super Bowl highlight film produced by NFL Films using film stock; beginning with the 1985 season, NFL Films videos were produced on videotape.

The Oliver Stone film, Any Given Sunday, features an (off-screen) "Pantheon Cup" championship game where San Francisco beats Miami, 32–13. Stone, a longtime 49ers fan, based his film's finale on Super Bowl XIX.

A major plot point in the episode "Post Traumatic Slide Syndrome" of the television show Sliders is based on this game. In the alternate reality, the 49ers play the Jets in the Super Bowl, which leads the main character Quinn Mallory to the conclusion that something is awry.

Entertainment

Pre-game
The pre-game festivities featured a tribute to the NFL and an appearance by various team mascots. Later, a mega-choir formed by members of the San Francisco Children's Chorus, San Francisco Boys Chorus, San Francisco Girls Chorus and Piedmont Children's Choir performed the national anthem under well known choir director Louis Magor.

In honor of Inauguration Day, Ronald Reagan, himself a longtime California resident and former Governor of the state from 1967 to 1975, became the first president to participate in a Super Bowl coin toss ceremony. However, he did it from the White House via satellite. Pro Football Hall of Fame running back Hugh McElhenny, a former 49er, was on the field during the ceremony. The U.S. Air Force provided four T-37 aircraft from nearby Mather Air Force Base (Sacramento, CA) and its 455th Flying Training Squadron for the fly-over. At $255 per hour of flying time for each aircraft, this T-37 flyover ranks as the most economical in the history of Super Bowls. In addition, all the pilots were young officers symbolizing California as the land of opportunity and youth.

Halftime
The halftime show was titled "World of Children's Dreams" and featured Tops In Blue, an elite performing tour ensemble consisting of members from the U.S. Air Force. Additional performers were recruited from USAF active, retired, and their dependents.

Game summary

Instead of the predicted shootout between Dan Marino and Joe Montana, the game was mostly one-sided. The 49ers' defense only allowed 25 rushing yards and 16 Dolphins points. San Francisco also intercepted Marino twice and sacked him 4 times. The Dolphins set a Super Bowl record for fewest rush attempts in a game (9).

First quarter
In the opening minutes of the game, it seemed that the game would live up to the hype. On the opening kickoff, 49ers rookie kick returner Derrick Harmon caught the ball too close to the sidelines and stepped out of bounds at the San Francisco 6-yard line. The 49ers managed to advance to the 41-yard line but were forced to punt, and Dolphins defensive back Fulton Walker returned the punt 9 yards to the Miami 36-yard line. Then on their first play of the drive, Marino completed a 25-yard pass to Tony Nathan. Five plays later, Miami reached the San Francisco 23-yard line. But on third down, 49ers cornerback Eric Wright tackled wide receiver Mark Clayton 2 yards shy of the first down. Miami had to settle for a 37-yard field goal from Uwe von Schamann.

The Dolphins' 3–0 lead did not last long, as the 49ers stormed down the field on their next possession.  San Francisco drove 78 yards in 8 plays, culminating in a 33-yard touchdown pass from Montana to reserve running back Carl Monroe to give them a 7–3 lead. But Miami retook the lead on their ensuing drive. After a 5-yard rush by Nathan, the Dolphins went into a no-huddle offense, preventing the 49ers from making substitutions and keeping their run defense on the field. Marino completed five consecutive passes, hitting Clayton for 18 yards, Mark Duper for 11, Clayton again for 13, and tight end Dan Johnson for 21.  On the next play, Marino finished the drive by hitting Johnson for a 2-yard touchdown pass, giving the Dolphins a 10–7 lead with 45 seconds left in the first quarter.

Second quarter
In the second quarter, the 49ers began to take control of the game. Bill Walsh switched to a 4–1–6 (or dime defense) to slow down Miami's passing attack, with Keena Turner as the sole linebacker. Miami tried to run against the 4–1–6 alignment, to no avail. Safety Dwight Hicks broke up two consecutive Marino passes, and the Dolphins were forced to punt from their own 10-yard line. Then after taking the ball at the Miami 47-yard line, Montana scrambled for a 19-yard run, and then completed a 16-yard pass to wide receiver Dwight Clark to reach the 12-yard line. From there, Wendell Tyler rushed for 4 yards, and then Montana threw an 8-yard touchdown pass to Roger Craig, giving the 49ers a 14–10 lead.

Miami then had to punt again on their ensuing possession, and San Francisco defensive back Dana McLemore returned the ball 28 yards to the 49ers 45-yard line. After advancing 15 yards with two running plays, Montana completed a pair of passes to tight end Russ Francis to move the ball 29 yards to the Miami 11-yard line. Craig ran for 5 yards on the next play, and then Montana ran the final 6 yards to the end zone for a touchdown, making the score 21–10. After the ensuing kickoff, Miami again was forced to punt after three plays, and McLemore returned Reggie Roby's 39-yard punt 10 yards to the 49ers 48-yard line. Montana was sacked for a 5-yard loss by Doug Betters on the first play of the ensuing drive, but he struck back with a 20-yard completion to Craig and a 7-yard run over the next two plays. On the next play, wide receiver Freddie Solomon caught a pass from Montana, took one step, and then lost the ball due to a hit from safety Lyle Blackwood. Blackwood quickly recovered the ball and took off for the 49ers' end zone, but field judge Bob Lewis blew the play dead, ruling that Solomon's fumble was an incomplete pass. Bill Quinby, the side judge, who was nearest to the play, did not make any call. Five plays later, Craig finished the nine-play, 52-yard drive with his second touchdown on a 2-yard run, increasing the 49ers' lead to 28–10.

With about two minutes left in the half, the Dolphins finally managed to get a good drive going on their next possession. Marino completed seven out of nine passes, the last one being a 30-yard pass to tight end Joe Rose, to reach the 49ers' 12-yard line. However, San Francisco's defense tightened up on the next three plays, forcing two incompletions and a completed pass for no gain, and Miami was forced to settle for von Schamann's second field goal of the game to cut their deficit to 28–13 with 12 seconds left in the half. Then Miami caught a break as the 49ers botched the ensuing kickoff. San Francisco lineman Guy McIntyre received von Schamann's short kick and was about to down the ball, but then changed his mind at the last second and decided to return it. This turned out to be a big mistake; McIntyre fumbled while being leveled by rookie Joe Carter, and Jim Jensen recovered the ball for Miami at the 49ers' 12-yard line. After that, von Schamann kicked his third field goal on the last play of the half, cutting the score to 28–16. "I can laugh about the play now, but it wasn't funny at the time," McIntyre said after the game. "My first instinct when I got the ball was to fall down. Then I heard everyone yelling, 'Get up! Get up!' So I got up, and here comes someone sneaking underneath me, and he hit the ball."

Second half
However, any thoughts of a Miami comeback ended early in the third quarter. On the first play of the second half, 49ers defensive end Dwaine Board tackled Nathan for a 1-yard loss.  After an incompletion, he sacked Marino for a 9-yard loss on third down, and McLemore returned Roby's 45-yard punt 8 yards to the 49ers 47-yard line. Montana went on to complete a 15-yard pass to Tyler and gain 12 yards on a scramble as he led San Francisco 43 yards in 9 plays to score on Ray Wersching's 27-yard field goal. On the Dolphins' ensuing drive, they were forced to punt again after Marino was sacked twice (once by defensive lineman Manu Tuiasosopo and once by Board). Starting on their own 30-yard line after a 5-yard return by McLemore, Montana completed a 40-yard pass to Tyler, followed up with a 14-yard completion to Francis. Three plays later, Craig scored his third touchdown on a 16-yard reception to make the score 38–16. The score proved to be the last one from either team, as the defenses of both teams took over for the rest of the game – especially the 49ers' defense, who intercepted Marino twice.

Highlights
Overall, San Francisco gained a Super Bowl-record 537 yards, breaking the Oakland Raiders' record of 429 yards in Super Bowl XI, while limiting Miami to 314, with just 25 rushing yards. San Francisco's 38 points also tied a Super Bowl record set by the Raiders in Super Bowl XVIII.

The 49ers' 288 offensive yards in the first half also tied the Raiders in Super Bowl XI for the most offensive yards in a half during a Super Bowl.

Marino finished the game with 29 out of 50 pass completions for 318 yards, 1 touchdown, and 2 interceptions. Clayton was the top receiver of the game, with 6 receptions for 92 yards. Walker returned 4 kickoffs for 93 yards and gained 15 yards on 2 punt returns. Nathan was the Dolphins leading rusher with 18 yards, while also catching 10 passes for 83 yards. Craig had 58 rushing yards, 77 receiving yards, and 3 touchdowns. He was the first player to score 3 touchdowns in a Super Bowl, and his 2 touchdown catches also tied a Super Bowl record. Tyler led San Francisco in rushing with 65 yards, and also caught 4 passes for 70 yards. Clark caught 6 passes for 77 yards. Board recorded 2 sacks. McLemore recorded 51 punt return yards, the second most in Super Bowl history. Sports Illustrated called 49ers defensive tackle Gary Johnson the Super Bowl's "unofficial defensive MVP" after he recorded one sack, flushed Marino out of the pocket numerous times, and had four unassisted tackles.

49ers rookie defensive tackle Michael Carter became the first athlete to win an Olympic medal and Super Bowl ring in the same year.  Before this game he had won a silver medal in the shot put competition at the 1984 Summer Olympics.

This would be the final game for San Francisco linebacker Jack Reynolds.

Reactions
After the game, Lyle Blackwood criticized the referee's ruling of Freddie Solomon's fumble as an incomplete pass. "You don't want the game to hinge on that play, but you never know," Blackwood said. "I could have taken the ball up the sideline. That's a 14-point swing." However, other Dolphins were not convinced. "We were dominated to the point where one play didn't make much of a difference," said Dolphins coach Don Shula. "Our major objective was to contain Montana, and we did a terrible, terrible job of it," added defensive coach Chuck Studley. Even Reggie Roby, who averaged only 39.3 yards per punt and didn't place any of his 6 punts inside the 20, took some responsibility for the loss. "I was trying to kill the ball, and I kicked it bad," he said. "I didn't hit one well. I was scared – scared to make a mistake. It was the worst game of my life, counting high school, college, counting everything." Meanwhile, in the 49ers' locker room, Joe Montana had his own explanation for the win. "As far as my own game, well, I'd have to admit it was pretty close to the best I've ever played. I didn't throw anything I didn't have confidence in. We got in sort of a groove. Once you get going like that you gain confidence, and it carries over to the defense, and then back to the offense. It's a snowball kind of thing."

The 49ers' offensive line dominated the Dolphins' undersized defensive line, a major reason why Montana was only sacked once. Offensive line coach Bobb McKittrick recalled that when he and his linemen looked at film of the game, they were surprised at how one-sided the matchup was. According to McKittrick, he and the linemen wondered, "This is a Super Bowl defense?"

Walsh recalled that he could see "a distinct difference" between his 49ers and the Dolphins during warmups. According to Walsh, it was obvious that the Dolphins were "a one-dimensional team" with no real ground game to compliment Marino's passing, and were nowhere near as physical as the 49ers.

Box score

Final statistics
Sources: NFL.com Super Bowl XIX , Super Bowl XIX Play Finder SF, Super Bowl XIX Play Finder Mia

Statistical comparison

Individual statistics

1Completions/attempts
2Rushing attempts
3Long gain
4Receptions
5Times targeted

Records set
The following records were set in Super Bowl XIX, according to the official NFL.com boxscore and the Pro-Football-Reference.com game summary. Some records have to meet NFL minimum number of attempts to be recognized. The minimums are shown (in parenthesis).

Starting lineups
Source:

Officials
 Referee: Pat Haggerty #40 third Super Bowl (XIII, XVI)
 Umpire: Tom Hensley #19 first Super Bowl
 Head Linesman: Leo Miles #35 third Super Bowl (VIII, X)
 Line Judge: Ray Dodez #74 first Super Bowl
 Back Judge: Tom Kelleher #25 fifth Super Bowl (IV, VII, XI, XV)
 Side Judge: Bill Quinby #58 first Super Bowl
 Field Judge: Bob Lewis #18 first Super Bowl
 Alternate Referee: Jerry Markbreit #9 worked Super Bowls XVII, XXI, XXVI, XXIX on field
 Alternate Umpire: Bob Boylston #101 worked Super Bowls XXI, XXVI on field

Tom Kelleher became the first official to work five Super Bowls, a record which has been tied by four other officials, but never surpassed.

References
Specific

General

 Super Bowl official website
 
 
 
 https://www.pro-football-reference.com – Large online database of NFL data and statistics
 Super Bowl play-by-plays from USA Today (Last accessed September 28, 2005)
 All-Time Super Bowl Odds from The Sports Network (Last accessed October 16, 2005)
 

Super Bowl
San Francisco 49ers postseason
Miami Dolphins postseason
1984 National Football League season
1985 in American football
American football competitions in California
American football in the San Francisco Bay Area
January 1985 sports events in the United States
1985 in sports in California
1985 in American television